Gerres is a genus of mojarras found mostly in coastal regions from the eastern Atlantic Ocean through the Indian Ocean to the western Pacific. A single species, G. simillimus, is from the East Pacific. They mainly inhabit salt and brackish waters, but will enter fresh water. At least one species, Gerres cinereus (yellowfin mojarra), displays an ability akin to gyroscopic stability, allowing it to remain in a remarkably static spatial position relative to the water flowing around it.

Species 
The 28 currently recognized species in this genus are:
 Gerres akazakii Iwatsuki, Seishi Kimura & Yoshino, 2007 (Japanese ten-spined silver-biddy)
 Gerres baconensis (Evermann & Seale, 1907) (scaly-snouted silver-biddy)
 Gerres chrysops Iwatsuki, Seishi Kimura & Yoshino, 1999 (gold sheen silver-biddy)
 Gerres cinereus (Walbaum, 1792) (yellowfin mojarra)
 Gerres decacanthus (Bleeker, 1864) (small Chinese silver-biddy)
 Gerres equulus Temminck & Schlegel, 1844 (Japanese silver-biddy)
 Gerres erythrourus (Bloch, 1791) (deep-bodied mojarra)
 Gerres filamentosus G. Cuvier, 1829 (whipfin silver-biddy)
 Gerres infasciatus Iwatsuki & Seishi Kimura, 1998 (nonbanded whipfin mojarra)
 Gerres japonicus Bleeker,  1854 (Japanese silver-biddy)
 Gerres limbatus G. Cuvier, 1830 (saddleback silver-biddy)
 Gerres longirostris (Lacépède, 1801) (strongspine silver-biddy)

 Gerres macracanthus Bleeker,  1854 (longspine silverbiddy)
 Gerres maldivensis Regan, 1902
 Gerres methueni Regan, 1920 (Striped silver biddy)
 Gerres microphthalmus Iwatsuki, Seishi Kimura & Yoshino, 2002 (small-eyed whipfin mojarra)
 Gerres mozambiquensis Iwatsuki & Heemstra, 2007
 Gerres nigri Günther, 1859 (Guinean striped mojarra)
 Gerres oblongus G. Cuvier, 1830 (slender silver-biddy)
 Gerres oyena (Forsskål, 1775) (common silver-biddy)
 Gerres phaiya Iwatsuki & Heemstra, 2001 (strong-spined silver-biddy)
 Gerres ryukyuensis Iwatsuki, Seishi Kimura & Yoshino, 2007 (Ryukyu banded silver-biddy)
 Gerres septemfasciatus J. Liu & Y. R. Yan, 2009 (seven-banded silver-biddy)
 Gerres setifer (F. Hamilton, 1822) (small Bengal silver-biddy)
 Gerres shima Iwatsuki, Seishi Kimura & Yoshino, 2007 (banded silver-biddy)
 Gerres silaceus Iwatsuki, Seishi Kimura & Yoshino, 2001 (Malayan silver-biddy)
 Gerres simillimus Regan, 1907
 Gerres subfasciatus G. Cuvier, 1830 (common silver belly)

References 

 
Gerreidae